Lollu Sabha Manohar is an Indian actor and comedian who has appeared in Tamil cinema. He started his career with the television show Lollu Sabha alongside other comedians, including Santhanam.

Career
Manohar first garnered attention through his performances in the spoof show Lollu Sabha on Vijay TV. The series spawned several successful comedians, who eventually moved on to appear in Tamil cinema including many of the show's lead cast such as Santhanam, Swaminathan, Jeeva, and Balaji. Other supporting actors such as Yogi Babu and Madhumitha also became popular actors in the film industry. At the height of the show's success, Manohar, along with three other cast members, received mysterious parcel bombs. As a part of the show, Manohar was known for his signature body language. In 2017, he protested against PETA's proposed ban of jallikattu.

Filmography
Films

Television

References

External links
 

Living people
Tamil male actors
Tamil comedians
Indian male film actors
Tamil male television actors
Television personalities from Tamil Nadu
Male actors from Tamil Nadu
Male actors in Tamil cinema
21st-century Tamil male actors
Indian male comedians
1954 births